Wales Emmons was a Democratic member of the Wisconsin State Assembly. Emmons represented Jefferson County, Wisconsin.

References

People from Jefferson County, Wisconsin
Year of birth missing
Year of death missing
Democratic Party members of the Wisconsin State Assembly